Kim Cheol-min (Hangul: 김철민, ; born 29 November 1992) is a South Korean speed skater.

Career

Short track career
Kim started short track speed skating as a child. In 2010, Kim was selected for the South Korean national short track speed skating team to compete in the 2010-11 ISU Short Track Speed Skating World Cup series, where he won gold in the 1500 metres at the fourth race in Shanghai and had two podium finishes as part of the relay team. In March 2011, Kim won the gold medal at the World Team Championships held in Warsaw, alongside overall world champions Noh Jin-kyu and Lee Ho-suk.

Long track career
In early 2011, Kim turned to long track speed skating. After winning two medals at the 2012 World Junior Speed Skating Championships in Obihiro, Kim was selected as a member of the South Korean national speed skating team for the 2012-13 season. He captured silver in the team pursuit race at the 2013 World Single Distance Championships, alongside 2010 Olympic champion Lee Seung-hoon and Joo Hyong-jun.

2014 Winter Olympics
At the 2014 Winter Olympics in Sochi, Russia, Kim first competed on February 8, 2014 in the 5000 metres. In the 5000 m, Kim finished 24th among 26 skaters in 6:37.28.

The South Korean pursuit team for the 2014 Olympics consisted of Kim, Lee Seung-hoon and Joo Hyong-jun. South Korea eliminated Russia in the quarterfinal, which advanced them to face reigning Olympic Champion Canada in the semifinal. South Korea then beat the Canadian team by 2.96 seconds, with a final time of 3:42.32. The South Korean team eventually won the silver medal, defeated by the Netherlands in the gold medal final by 3.14 seconds, with a final time of 3:40.85.

Personal life
He is the brother of short track speed skater Kim Dam-min.

Records

Personal records (long track)

References

External links
 Profile from 2014 Olympic Games official website
 

1992 births
Living people
South Korean male speed skaters
South Korean male short track speed skaters
Olympic speed skaters of South Korea
Olympic silver medalists for South Korea
Olympic medalists in speed skating
Speed skaters at the 2014 Winter Olympics
Medalists at the 2014 Winter Olympics
Speed skaters at the 2017 Asian Winter Games
World Single Distances Speed Skating Championships medalists
Universiade medalists in short track speed skating
Universiade gold medalists for South Korea
Competitors at the 2013 Winter Universiade